Kim Lewis is an American researcher, author and academic. He is a University Distinguished Professor and the director of Antimicrobial Discovery Center at Northeastern University.

Lewis' research is focused on antimicrobial tolerance which limits the ability of antibiotics to eradicate an infection; and on antimicrobial drug discovery.

He is a fellow of the American Association for the Advancement of Science, and of the American Academy of Microbiology.

Education 
Lewis received a B.S. in Biology in 1976 and a Ph.D. in Biochemistry in 1980, both from Moscow University.

Career 
In 1976, Lewis joined Moscow University as a researcher. He continued working there until 1984, when he applied to emigrate to the USA. He moved to the United States in 1987, where he joined University of Wisconsin as a research associate. In 1988, he left University of Wisconsin and joined MIT as an assistant professor. He left MIT to join University of Maryland, Baltimore in 1994.

Lewis joined Tufts University as a Research Associate Professor in 1997 and taught there until 2001, when he joined Northeastern University. In 2004, he became a distinguished research fellow, and in 2011, a distinguished professor at Northeastern University.

Research and work 
Lewis' research is focused on antimicrobial tolerance which limits the ability of antibiotics to eradicate an infection; and on antimicrobial drug discovery. He discovered that biofilm recalcitrance to treatment is due to the presence of dormant persister cells tolerant to killing by antibiotics. His research further showed that persisters are cells with low level of ATP, which drops as a result of stochastic variation in expression of energy producing components. He discovered that acyldepsipeptide (ADEP) kills persisters in S. aureus and other bacteria by activating the Clp protease, forcing the cell to self-digest. A new antimicrobial, lassomycin, that his team discovered from an uncultured bacterium, kills M. tuberculosis, including persister cells, by activating the C1 ATPase subunit of the ClpC1P1P2 protease, causing ATP depletion and death.

In early 2000s, Lewis began working in collaboration with Slava Epstein to solve the problem that uncultured bacteria could not be grown in vitro. They reasoned uncultured bacteria will grow in their natural environment, and developed a diffusion chamber where they are incubated in their natural environment. In a paper published in Science in 2002, they reported growth of uncultured bacteria in a diffusion chamber.

Lewis has been involved in antimicrobial drug discovery for over a decade. They developed methods to mine uncultured bacteria for novel compounds. Of especial interest is teixobactin, a novel cell wall acting antibiotic that binds to different precursors of cell wall polymers. This is the first antibiotic that acts without detectable resistance.

The paper describing the discovery of teixobactin was the most discussed publication of that year, according to Altmetric.

More recently, Lewis and his group refocused their program on discovery of compounds acting against Gram negative pathogens, and discovered a new class of antibiotics, darobactins, inhibitors of BamA, an essential protein of the outer membrane.

Awards and honors 
2006 - Member, Faculty of 1000 in the Pharmacology & Drug Discovery section 
2009 - NIH Director’s Transformative Award
2011 - Fellow, American Academy of Microbiology
2013 - Lester O. Krampitz Lecture, Case Western Reserve University
2015 - Honorary Lecture, NYU School of Medicine
2015 - Lecture, Biomedical Research Council of the US Congress
2017 - NIH Director’s Walls Lecture
2018 - Highly Cited Researcher, Clarivate Analytics
2023 - American Society for Microbiology Award for Applied and Biotechnological Research

Books 
Bacterial Resistance to Antimicrobials: Mechanisms, Genetics, Medical Practice and Public Health (2001)
Persister Cells and Infectious Disease (2019)

References

External links 
Kim Lewis on Northeastern University
The Lewis Lab

Living people
Northeastern University faculty
Moscow State University alumni
Year of birth missing (living people)